Jana Jacková (born 6 August 1982) is a Czech chess player. She played for the Czech team in following Chess Olympiads: Elista 1998, Istanbul 2000, Bled 2002, Calvià 2004, Turin 2006 and Dresden 2008. In 2002 and in 2006 the team came to the tenth place in the final ranking. 

In 2007, she played a friendly match against Dutch Grandmaster Jan Timman in Prague.

References

External links

team chess record at olimpbase.org (partial)

1982 births
Living people
Czech female chess players
Chess International Masters
Chess woman grandmasters
Chess Olympiad competitors